The 1938 Toledo Rockets football team was an American football team that represented Toledo University in the Ohio Athletic Conference (OAC) during the 1938 college football season. In their third season under head coach Clarence Spears, the Rockets compiled a 6–3–1 record.

Schedule

After the season

The 1939 NFL Draft was held on December 9, 1938. The following Rocket was selected.

References

Toledo
Toledo Rockets football seasons
Toledo Rockets football